Karratha Airport  is an airport in Karratha, in the Pilbara region of Western Australia.

History
At the beginning of the iron ore industry in the early 1960s, Dampier was chosen as the Port for Hamersley Iron's operations and this signaled the beginning of major development in the Pilbara. Roebourne airport was the nearest airport. In 1966 Hamersley Iron constructed an airport on the present Karratha Airport site with a sealed gravel runway and small terminal building and named it Dampier Airport. With the introduction of the Fokker F-28 jet aircraft by MMA in 1969, regular passenger flights by MacRobertson Miller Airlines to the unsealed Roebourne airport were discontinued.

After several years as a private airport, the airport was taken over by the Shire of Roebourne. Several upgrades have been made over the decades including a new runway, 08/26, and new terminals. The old runway is now used as a taxiway and helicopter landing site (HLS) for the many helicopters servicing the facilities in the North West Shelf gas field and marine pilot transfers for iron ore and gas ships using the nearby ports of Dampier and Walcott. The runway is capable of handling aircraft up to 737-800 size routinely, but can handle up to a Boeing 767-300, Boeing C-17 Globemaster III or even Antonov An-124 Ruslan.

From the 1960s to the 1980s, MMA was the largest operator serving Karratha. East-West Airlines introduced services in the 1980s to compete with the Ansett group until it was absorbed by Ansett. Airliners operated into Karratha over the decades include the Fokker F-27, Fokker F-28, BAe 146, Fokker 100, Boeing 717, Embraer E-Jets (170 & 190) and the Boeing 737. Bristow Helicopters, CHC Helicopters and Helicopters NZ also have bases in Karratha operating helicopters such as the Agusta 109, Agusta 139, Sikorsky S76, Aerospatiale Super Puma and Airbus Helicopters EC225.

Karratha Airport is the second busiest airport in Western Australia that handles commercial flights, with Perth Airport being the busiest and has played a major role in the development of the Pilbara region. In the year ending 30 June 2009 the airport handled 486,582 passengers nearly 100,000 increase over 2008 and was ranked 18th busiest in Australia. For the year ending June 2010 it had increased to 587,211 passengers and by 2011 it had reached 675,207 passengers. Of these passengers the vast majority are what is known in Australia as fly-in fly-out workers. The airport is now the 17th busiest.

Karratha Airport has undergone a major revamp following a Council decision to redevelop the terminal. The $35 million upgrade provides several major changes within the terminal and includes a new cafe, bar, combined arrivals and departure area, new toilet facilities, improved security screening and baggage reclaim. The terminal was officially opened by Deputy Prime Minister Warren Truss on 25 September 2015.

Qantas previously linked Karratha with Brisbane, as well as Melbourne and Sydney, but withdrew the services in 2014 amid a downturn in the mining industry. Flights between Karratha and Brisbane were set to resume in 2018, but after would-be operator JETGO Australia was placed into liquidation, the service was cancelled.

Airlines and destinations

Statistics

Operations

See also
 List of airports in Western Australia

References

External links

Arrivals and Departures
 Airservices Aerodromes & Procedure Charts

Pilbara airports
City of Karratha